S. calcarata could refer to one of the following species:
Scaphiophryne calcarata, a frog of the family Microhylidae
Scolopendra calcarata, a centipede of the family Scolopendridae
Scopula calcarata, a moth of the family Geometridae
Stenodema calcarata, an insect of the family Miridae